The Wonnarua people, otherwise written Wanarruwa, are a group of Aboriginal Australian people united by strong ties of kinship, and who survived in family groups or clans scattered along the inland area of what is now known as the Upper Hunter Valley, New South Wales, Australia. Their creation spirit is Baiami, also known as Koin, the creator of all things and the Keeper of the Valley.

Language
The origin of the Wonnarua language is unclear; however, linguists group closely-related dialects together under the description "language of the Hunter River/Lake Macquarie" (HRLM). That term denotes the geographical location of the closely-related dialects rather than the name of the language group. The area extends from north of the Hawkesbury–MacDonald River (HMR) language and south of the Lower North Coast language (LNC). Exact geographical locations of the language groups are, at this stage, speculative.

Country
The Wonnarua were bounded to the north by the Geawegal people, to the north–east by the Worimi peoples, to the south east by the Awabakal people, to the south by the Darkinung and to the west by the Wiradjuri people. The Wonnarua also had trade and ceremonial links with the Kamilaroi people.

People
The Wonnarua, at the beginning of contact with whites, are estimated to have numbered around 500.

The Gringai were a clan of the Worimi, whose traditional lands are in the Dungog area.

Native title
On behalf of the Plains Clans of the Wonnarua People, Scott Franks and Anor put in a native title claim on 19 August 2013. The claim included Singleton, Muswellbrook, Dungog, Maitland, and the shire council lands of the Upper Hunter. The claim was registered in January 2015 and referred to the Federal Court deliberate over the claim and to make a determination. However, it was ultimately discontinued and removed from the register of native title claims on 2 March 2020. The discontinuance appears to have been the result of disputes with other Aboriginal people who claimed native title in the area but in a different way and these disputes led to an independent anthropologist, Dr Lee Sackett, being appointed by the Court to prepare a report to resolve the different views of native title in the area. Dr Sackett's conclusions were to the effect that key details of the claim's structure were not supported by the evidence.

Notable Wonnarua people
 Jackey Jackeya guide and companion to surveyor Edmund Kennedy.
 Charles Frederick Maynard - an activist

Alternative names
 Wannerawa
 Wonnah
 Wonnuaruah/Wonarua

Source:

Notes

Citations

Sources

 Alternate copy.

Further reading

External links
 Wonnarua Nation Aboriginal Corporation website
 Wonnarua Nation Aboriginal Corporation Strategic Plan 2009–2012

Aboriginal peoples of New South Wales
Hunter Region